The New York University Journal of Law & Liberty is a law journal at the New York University School of Law that publishes scholarship related to law and classical liberalism.

History
The journal was established in 2005 by students Robert Sarvis and Robert McNamara. In 2008, an article published by the journal was cited by Justice Antonin Scalia in his majority opinion in the landmark United States Supreme Court case of District of Columbia v. Heller. The journal also presents the annual Friedrich A. von Hayek Lecture jointly with the Classical Liberal Institute of New York University School of Law.

See also
 List of law reviews in the United States
 Harvard Journal of Law and Public Policy
 Libertarian theories of law

References

External links
 

American law journals
General law journals
Publications established in 2005
2005 establishments in New York City
Law journals edited by students
New York University academic journals
New York University School of Law
Triannual journals
English-language journals
Classical liberalism
Libertarian publications